Youngstown is a city in the U.S. state of Ohio, and the largest city and county seat of Mahoning County. At the 2020 census, Youngstown had a city population of 60,068, making it the 11th largest city in Ohio. It is a principal city of the Youngstown–Warren metropolitan area, which had a population of 541,243 in 2020, making it the seventh-largest metro area in Ohio and 107th-largest metro area in the United States.

In addition to having its own media market, Youngstown is also part of the larger Northeast Ohio region. Youngstown is midway between Chicago and New York City via Interstate 80.

The city was named for John Young, an early settler from Whitestown, New York, who established the community's first sawmill and gristmill. It was an early industrial city of the late 19th and early 20th centuries; with restructuring of heavy industry and movement of jobs offshore, it has been classified as part of the Rust Belt. Traditionally known as a center of steel production, Youngstown has been forced to adapt after the steel industry in the United States fell into decline in the 1970s, leaving communities throughout the region without any major industry. There has been a decline in population of more than 60% since 1959.

Downtown Youngstown has seen tremendous change since 2010. It has become a center of culture, entertainment, and innovation. It is now home to bars, restaurants, and the recently completed Youngstown Foundation Amphitheater. Youngstown's first new downtown hotel since 1974—the DoubleTree by Hilton—opened in 2018 in the historic Stambaugh Building, adapted for this use. First floor commercial space includes a restaurant. Several businesses, such as Turning Technologies, an education technology company, are headquartered in Downtown Youngstown.

History

Founding

Youngstown was named for New York native John Young, who surveyed the area in 1796 and settled there soon afterward. The 1797 establishment of Youngstown was officially recorded on August 19, 1802.

The area that includes present-day Youngstown was part of the Connecticut Western Reserve, a section of the Northwest Territory that Connecticut initially did not cede to the federal government. Upon cession, Connecticut retained the title to the land in the Western Reserve, which it sold to the Connecticut Land Company for $1,200,000. While many of the area's early settlers came from Connecticut, Youngstown attracted many Scots-Irish settlers from neighboring Pennsylvania. The first European Americans to settle permanently in the area were Pittsburgh native James Hillman and wife Catherine Dougherty. By 1798, Youngstown was the home of several families who were concentrated near where Mill Creek meets the Mahoning River. Boardman Township was founded in 1798 by Elijah Boardman, a member of the Connecticut Land Company. Also founded in 1798 was Austintown by John McCollum who was a settler from New Jersey.

As the Western Reserve's population grew, the need for administrative districts became apparent. In 1800, territorial governor Arthur St. Clair established Trumbull County (named in honor of Connecticut Governor Jonathan Trumbull), and designated the smaller settlement of Warren as its administrative center, or county seat. In 1813, Trumbull County was divided into townships, with Youngstown Township comprising much of what became Mahoning County. The village of Youngstown was incorporated in 1848, and in 1867 Youngstown was chartered as a city. It became the county seat in 1876, when the administrative center of Mahoning County was moved from neighboring Canfield. Youngstown has been Mahoning County's county seat to this day.

Growth and industrialization
The discovery of coal by the community in the early 19th century paved the way for the Youngstown area's inclusion on the network of the famed Erie Canal. The Pennsylvania and Ohio Canal Company was organized in 1835, and the canal was completed in 1840. Local industrialist David Tod, who became Ohio governor during the Civil War, persuaded Lake Erie steamboat owners that coal mined in the Mahoning Valley could fuel their vessels if canal transportation were available between Youngstown and Cleveland. The railroad's arrival in 1856 smoothed the path for further economic growth.

Youngstown's industrial development changed the face of the Mahoning Valley. The community's burgeoning coal industry drew hundreds of immigrants from Wales, Germany, and Ireland. With the establishment of steel mills in the late 19th century, Youngstown became a popular destination for immigrants from Eastern Europe, Italy, and Greece.

In the early 20th century, the community saw an influx of immigrants from non-European countries including what is modern day Lebanon, Israel, Palestine, and Syria. By the 1920s, this dramatic demographic shift produced a nativist backlash, and the Mahoning Valley became a center of Ku Klux Klan activity. The situation reached a climax in 1924, when street clashes between Klan members and Italian and Irish Americans in neighboring Niles led Ohio Governor A. Victor Donahey to declare martial law. By 1928 the Klan was in steep decline; and three years later, the organization sold its Canfield, Ohio, meeting area, Kountry Klub Field. Despite the prevalence of Irish Americans in Youngstown, their presence wasn't always evident. When radio personality Pete Gabriel (who was Greek), came to Youngstown, he found out at the time that there was no St Patrick's Day parade there, so he started one.

The growth of industry attracted people from within the United States and from Latin America. By the late 19th century, African Americans were well represented in Youngstown, and the first local congregation of the African Methodist Episcopal Church was established in 1871. In the 1880s, local attorney William R. Stewart was the second African American elected to the Ohio House of Representatives. A large influx of African Americans in the early 20th century owed much to developments in the industrial sector. During the national Steel Strike of 1919, local industrialists recruited thousands of workers from the Southern United States, many of whom were Black. This move inflamed racist sentiment among local Whites, and for decades, African-American steelworkers experienced discrimination in the workplace. Migration from the South rose dramatically in the 1940s, when the mechanization of southern agriculture brought an end to the sharecropping system, leading onetime farm laborers to seek industrial jobs.

Youngstown's local iron ore deposits were exhausted by the early 20th century. Since the city is landlocked (the Mahoning River is not navigable), ore from Michigan and Minnesota had to arrive by rail from Cleveland and other Great Lakes port cities where large bulk carriers were unloaded. This put Youngstown at a competitive disadvantage to the iron and steel producers in Cleveland, Buffalo, Chicago and Detroit—all on Great Lake shores. Compared to these four cities, Youngstown had a higher cost of transporting raw materials to the mills, according to a Harvard Business Review report published in January 1933. Higher transportation costs are one reason why Youngstown mills began their decline slightly earlier than manufacturing in other cities.

The city had a healthy position within the Midwest in terms of transportation connections. An airport built in 1930 hosted Capital and United Airlines flights through the region and to New York prior to the jet age of the latter 1950s. It was on the Baltimore and Ohio Railroad mainline to Chicago with the Capital Limited. Likewise, Youngstown was on the Erie Railroad mainline, on its Chicago-Jersey City circuit, with trains such as the Atlantic Express/Pacific Express and the Lake Cities. The city was on the New York Central's Pittsburgh-Buffalo circuit and the Pennsylvania Railroad's Pittsburgh-Cleveland circuit.

Post-World War II decline
The city's population became more diverse after the end of World War II, when a seemingly robust steel industry attracted thousands of workers. In the 1950s, the Latino population grew significantly; and by the 1970s, St. Rose of Lima Roman Catholic Church and the First Spanish Baptist Church of Ohio were among the largest religious institutions for Spanish-speaking residents in the Youngstown metropolitan area. In 1951, city planners projected that Youngstown would grow to 200,000 to 250,000 in population due to continuously strong demand for domestic steel in western Europe, Japan, and South Korea, and so 12,000 acres on the city's East Side were annexed and extended utilities in expectation of future housing projects, in addition to aggressive re-zoning for expanded commercial spaces throughout the city.

At 11:30 on Wednesday, September 6, 1967, only 9 of the 50 scheduled patrolmen arrived for work at the Youngstown Police Department.  The others were not on strike.  That was prevented by Ohio state law.  The patrolmen, eventually numbering 300, along with another 300 city-employed firefighters, were instead attending "continuous professional meetings", and would be until their demand for an immediate across-the-board raise of $1200 was met.  By Saturday, the day they were ordered back to their jobs by a Common Pleas Court judge, citizens were reported as disturbed, rather than badly frightened, by the risks of police and fire services operating at about 30% normal headcounts.  A car fire was the worst single incident.  When ending the strike the judge also ordered the pay raise.  Apart from a fruitless six-day "sick call" of police in Detroit in June 1967, Youngstown's was the first major police strike since the Boston Police Strike in 1919.  As the editorial writers at The Sheboygan Press of Sheboygan, Wisconsin put it, "So we have seen the first successful strike by policemen and firemen. It is a precedent over which there should be little rejoicing."

The industrial economy that drew various groups to the area collapsed in the late 1970s, culminating with the September 19, 1977 closure of the Youngstown Sheet and Tube Campbell Works after financial downturn due to changes in the steel manufacturing process and international competition. In response to subsequent challenges, the city has taken well-publicized steps to diversify economically, while building on some traditional strengths.

Modern developments

Downtown Youngstown has seen modest levels of new construction. In the 2000s, additions included the Nathaniel R. Jones Federal Building and U.S. Courthouse in 2002 (which features an award-winning design by the architectural firm, Robert A. M. Stern Architects), the Mahoning County Childrens Services center and George Voinovich Government Center in 2004, and both the Covelli Centre and Ohio Seventh District Court of Appeals in 2006.

In 2004, construction began on a 60-home upscale development called Arlington Heights, and a grant from the United States Department of Housing and Urban Development allowed for the demolition of Westlake Terrace, a sprawling and dilapidated public housing project. Today, the site features a blend of senior housing, rental townhouses and for-sale single-family homes. Low real-estate prices and the efforts of the Youngstown Central Area Improvement Corporation (CIC) have contributed to the purchase of several long-abandoned downtown buildings (many by out-of-town investors) and their restoration and conversion into specialty shops, restaurants, and eventually condominiums. In addition, a nonprofit organization called Wick Neighbors is planning a $250 million New Urbanist revitalization of Smoky Hollow, a former ethnic neighborhood that borders the downtown and university campus. The neighborhood will eventually comprise about 400 residential units, university student housing, retail space, and a central park. Construction for the project began in 2006.

In 2005, Federal Street, a major downtown thoroughfare that was closed off to create a pedestrian-oriented plaza, reopened to traffic. The downtown area has seen the razing of structurally unsound buildings and the expansion or restoration of others. New construction has dovetailed with efforts to cultivate business growth. One of the area's more successful business ventures in recent years has been the Youngstown Business Incubator. This nonprofit organization, based in a former downtown department store building, fosters the growth of fledgling technology-based companies. The incubator, which boasts more than a dozen business tenants, recently completed construction on the Taft Technology Center, where some of its largest tenants will locate their offices.

In line with these efforts to change the community's image, the city government, in partnership with Youngstown State University, has organized an ambitious urban renewal plan known as Youngstown 2010. The stated goals of Youngstown 2010 include the creation of a "cleaner, greener, and better planned and organized Youngstown". In January 2005, the organization unveiled a master plan prepared by Urban Strategies Inc. of Toronto, which had taken shape during an extensive process of public consultation and meetings that gathered input from citizens. The plan, which included platforms such as the acceptance of a reduced population and an improved image and quality of life, received national attention and is consistent with efforts in other metropolitan areas to address the phenomenon of urban depopulation. Youngstown 2010 received an award for public outreach from the American Planning Association in 2007.

Geography 

Youngstown is in the Mahoning Valley on the Glaciated Allegheny Plateau. At the end of the last ice age, the glaciers left behind a uniform plain, with valleys such as that caused by the Mahoning River traversing the plain. Lakes created by glaciers that dammed small streams were eventually drained, leaving behind fertile terrain.

Climate 
Youngstown has a humid continental climate (Köppen Dfb/Dfa), typical of the Midwestern United States, with four distinct seasons and lies within USDA hardiness zone 6a. Winters are cold and dry but typically bring a mix of rain, sleet, and snow with occasional heavy snowfall and icing. Springs generally see a transition to fewer weather systems that produce heavier rainfall. Summers are typically very warm and humid with temperatures exceeding  on 7.7 days per year on average; the annual count has been as high as 40 days in 1943, while the most recent year to not reach that mark is 2014.

The first and last freezes of the season on average fall on October 14 and May 6, respectively, allowing a growing season of 160 days; however, freezing temperatures have been observed in every month except July.

Neighborhoods

Central 

Central Youngstown consists of the original city layout designed by John Young, including Downtown Youngstown. Downtown Youngstown is the site of most of the city's government buildings and banks. A number of entertainment venues are also located in the downtown, including the Covelli Centre, Powers Auditorium, the DeYor Performing Arts Center, and Oakland Centers for the Performing Arts. In addition, the downtown sits to the immediate south of notable cultural and educational resources, including Youngstown State University, the Butler Institute of American Art, and the McDonough Museum of Contemporary Art. The Arlington, Mahoning Commons, Riverbend, Smoky Hollow and University neighborhoods that surround Downtown compromise what is considered Central Youngstown. The area is the smallest division of Youngstown, as well as its least populous, but also its least residential by zoning. It is surrounded by the I-680 and Madison Avenue Expressway highway system as all three of the Mahoning River, Crab Creek and Mill Creek pass through the area.

North Side 

The North Side consists of the Brier Hill, Crandall Park, North Heights, and Wick Park neighborhoods and the northern section of the Riverbend Industrial Park. Brier Hill was considered one of the city's cultural hotbeds due to many Welsh, Irish, Italian, and African American migrants settling in it, but primarily was once viewed as the city's "Little Italy" as reflected by the Brier Hill-style pizza. Each year, at the end of August, the Brier Hill Fest attracts thousands of visitors from Northeast Ohio and Western Pennsylvania. The historic Crandall Park neighborhood was once home to the city's wealthiest families, and many of the mansions of industrial executives are still including in the Crandall Park-Fifth Avenue Historic District. The North Side is bounded by the Mahoning River abutting the West Side, Girard and Liberty to the North, Crab Creek to the east and the Madison Avenue Expressway to the south.

South Side 
Youngstown's South Side is, and historically has been, the city's densest and most populous division, with numerous neighborhoods from each of the city's periods of expansion. The older neighborhoods in this district, Oak Hill, Erie, Warren, and Lower Gibson, were among the first founded on the South Side during the 19th century and were completely annexed by 1910 as Youngstown grew from a farming community into an industrialized one. Later neighborhoods, such as Idora, Newport, Lansingville, Buckeye Plat, and Cottage Grove came into being as industry and population expanded throughout the first half of the 20th century, being annexed in 1929 from the remainder of Youngstown Township. The Pleasant Grove and Brownlee Woods neighborhoods further south were also annexed in 1929 from Boardman Township. These neighborhoods were generally well connected to each together and were defined by economic class as they became increasingly suburban further from the Downtown area. There are further sub-neighborhoods in the South Side as well, such as Indian Village, Handel's, Boulevard Park, Cochran Park, Powerstown, and Gibsonville that have distinct identities within their larger neighborhoods. The South Side shares Mill Creek Park with the West Side, and is bordered by the Mahoning River to the north and east. The southern border lies against Boardman and Struthers.

East Side 
The East Side is the largest of the city's regions by area and consists of the East High, East Side, Hazelton, Landsdowne, Lincoln Knolls, Scienceville and Sharon Line/McGuffey Heights communities. The neighborhoods on the East Side closest to Downtown Youngstown were among the earliest developed in the city. However, much of the East Side is undeveloped rural fields and forests, as the land was annexed in the 1950s as part of a zoning effort for future development that never occurred. The East Side is bounded by the Mahoning River on the south west, Crab Creek on the west, Liberty and Hubbard Township on the north, Coitsville Township on the east and the city of Campbell on the south.

West Side 
A total of eight neighborhoods comprises the West Side: Belle Vista, Cornersburg, Garden District, Kirkmere, Rocky Ridge, Salt Springs, Schenley, and Steelton. Altogether the most recently developed side of Youngstown, these neighborhoods were built from the 1930s until the 1950s progressing southward, apart from the early Steelton neighborhood and industrial Salt Springs neighborhood. It shares Mill Creek Park with the South Side and lies southwest of the Mahoning River. Girard and Weathersfield Township lie to the north, Austintown to the west and Boardman to the south.

Demographics

Between 1960 and 2010, the city's population declined by over 60%. The Mahoning Valley metropolitan area had 541,243 residents as of the 2020 census.

2020 Census
According to the 2020 Census, Youngstown had 28,303 households. The population density was 1770.5/sq mi. The city's racial makeup was 47.8% White, 41.1% African American, 0.3% Native American, 0.7% Asian, 0.0% Pacific Islander, and 7.4% from two or more races. Hispanic or Latino of any race were 10.9% of the population. The median household income was $30,129.

2010 Census
According to the 2010 Census, Youngstown had 26,839 households and 15,150 families. The population density was 755.2/km2 (1958.5/sq mi). There were 33,123 housing units at an average density of 968.5 per square mile (373.4/km2). Youngstown's vacant-housing rate in 2010 was twenty times the national average. The city's racial makeup was 47.0% White, 45.2% African American, 0.4% Native American, 0.4% Asian, 0.02% Pacific Islander, 3.3% of some other race, and 3.7% from two or more races. Hispanic or Latino of any race were 9.3% of the population. The European ancestry included had 10.8% Italian, 10.8% Irish, 10.0% German, and 4.2% English ancestries. Among the Hispanic population, 5.7% were Puerto Rican, 1.9% Mexican, 0.1% Cuban, and 0.7% some other Hispanic or Latino.

Records suggest 28.6% of the households had children under the age of 18. Of these, 25.6% were married couples living together, 24.8% had a female householder with no husband present, and 43.6% were non-families. Meanwhile, 37.8% of all households comprised a single person, and 14.5% of households comprised a person over 65 years of age living alone. The average household size was 2.28 and the average family size was 3.02.

22.8% of the city's population was under the age of 18, 10.8% was from age 18 to 24, 24.3% was from age 25 to 44, 26.2% was from age 45 to 64, and 15.8% was age 65 or older. The median age was 38 years old. For every 100 females, there were 96.9 males. For every 100 females age 18 and over, there were 95 males.

Economy

Historical 

Endowed with large deposits of coal and iron as well as "old growth" hardwood forests needed to produce charcoal, the Youngstown area developed a thriving steel industry, starting with the area's blast furnace in 1803 by James and Daniel Heaton. By the mid-19th century, Youngstown was the site of several iron industrial plants, and because of easy rail connections to adjacent states, the iron industry continued to expand in the 1890s despite the depletion of local natural resources. At the turn of the 20th century, local industrialists began to convert to steel manufacturing, amid a wave of industrial consolidations that placed much of the Mahoning Valley's industry in the hands of national corporations.

In the late 1930s, the community's steel sector again gained national attention when Youngstown became a site of the so-called "Little Steel Strike", an effort by the Steel Workers Organizing Committee, a precursor to United Steelworkers, to secure contract agreements with smaller steel companies. On June 21, 1937, strike-related violence in Youngstown resulted in two deaths and 42 injuries. Despite the violence, historian William Lawson observed that the strike transformed industrial unions from "basically local and ineffective organizations into all-encompassing, nationwide collective bargaining representatives of American workers".

Between the 1920s and 1960s, the city was known as an important industrial hub that featured the massive furnaces and foundries of such companies as Republic Steel and U.S. Steel. At the same time, Youngstown never became economically diversified, as did larger industrial cities such as Chicago, Pittsburgh, Akron, or Cleveland. Hence, when economic changes forced the closure of plants throughout the 1970s, the city was left with few substantial economic alternatives. The September 19, 1977, announcement of the closure of a large portion of Youngstown Sheet and Tube, an event still referred to as "Black Monday", is widely regarded as the death knell of the old area steel industry in Youngstown. In the wake of the steel plant shutdowns, the community lost an estimated 40,000 manufacturing jobs, 400 satellite businesses, $414 million in personal income, and from 33 to 75 percent of the school tax revenues. The Youngstown area has yet to fully recover from the loss of jobs in the steel sector.

Current 
Youngstown is the site of several steel and metalworking operations, though nothing on the scale seen during the "glory days" of the "Steel Valley". The city's largest employer is Youngstown State University (YSU), an urban public campus that serves about 15,000 students, just north of downtown.

The blow dealt to the community's industrial economy in the 1970s was slightly mitigated by the auto production plants in the metropolitan area. In the late 1980s, the Avanti, an automobile with a fiberglass body originally designed by Studebaker to compete with the Corvette, was manufactured in an industrial complex on Youngstown's Albert Street. This company moved away after just a few years. A mainstay of Youngstown's industrial economy has long been the GM Lordstown plant. The General Motors' Lordstown Assembly plant was the area's largest industrial employer. Once one of the nation's largest auto plants in terms of square feet, the Lordstown facility was home to production of the Chevrolet Impala, Vega, and Cavalier. It was expanded and retooled in 2002 with a new paint facility. However, this region was dealt another blow in early 2019 with the closing of Lordstown Assembly in March 2019.

The largest industrial employers within the city limits are Vallourec Star Steel Company (formerly North Star Steel), in the Brier Hill district, and Exal Corporation on Poland Avenue. The latter has recently expanded its operations.

Youngstown's downtown, which once underscored the community's economic difficulties, is a site of new business growth. The Youngstown Business Incubator (YBI), in the heart of downtown, houses several start-up technology companies that have received office space, furnishings, and access to utilities. Some Incubator-supported companies have earned recognition, and a few are starting to outgrow their current space. Inc. Magazine rated one such company–Turning Technologies–as the fastest-growing privately held software company in the United States and 18th fastest-growing privately held company overall. To keep such companies downtown, the YBI secured approval to demolish a row of nearby vacant buildings to clear space for expansion. The project will be funded by a $2 million federal grant awarded in 2006. In 2014, the YBI was ranked as the number 1 university associated business incubator in the world by the Swedish UBII (University Business Incubator Index). In 2015, the YBI was the top University Associated Incubator in North America, and came in second to the Dublin Enterprise & Technology Centre, also known as the Guinness Enterprise Centre, in Dublin.

Extensive coverage of Youngstown's economic challenges has overshadowed the city's long entrepreneurial tradition. A number of products and enterprises introduced in Youngstown became national household names. Among them is Youngstown-based Schwebel's Bakery, which was established in neighboring Campbell in the 20th century. The company now distributes bread products nationally. In the 1920s, Youngstown was the birthplace of the Good Humor brand of ice cream novelties, and the popular franchise of Handel's Homemade Ice Cream & Yogurt was established there in the 1940s. In the 1950s, Youngstown-born developer Edward J. DeBartolo Sr. established one of the country's first modern shopping plazas in the suburban Boardman. The fast-food chain, Arby's, opened the first of its restaurants in Boardman in 1964, and Arthur Treacher's Fish & Chips was headquartered in Youngstown in the late 1970s. More recently, the city's downtown hosted the corporate headquarters of the now-defunct pharmacy chain store Phar-Mor, which was established by Youngstown native Mickey Monus.

Culture

Entertainment 

Despite the impact of regional economic decline, Youngstown offers an array of cultural and recreational resources. Youngstown's newest venue is the Youngstown Foundation Amphitheatre; an outdoor venue opened in 2019 upon former industrial grounds in Downtown that hosts various musicians.

One of the city's sports-related attractions is the Covelli Centre, which was funded primarily through a $26 million federal grant secured in 2000 by then-Congressman Jim Traficant. Located on the site of an abandoned steel mill, the large, high-tech facility opened in October 2005. It was formerly called the Chevrolet Center, and during planning it was known as the Youngstown Convocation Center. The centre's main tenants are the Youngstown Phantoms, who play in the United States Hockey League. Previously, it was home to the Youngstown Steelhounds hockey team, who played in the CHL. The venue also hosts "on ice" musical shows and concerts.

Historically, one of the area's most popular attractions was Idora Park in the Idora neighborhood of Youngstown's south side. An urban amusement park, it operated from 1899 until it was closed after a large fire destroyed many of its premier rides in 1984.

Theater
The community's culture center is Powers Auditorium, a former Warner Brothers movie palace that serves as the area's primary music hall and a home for the Youngstown Symphony Orchestra. This downtown landmark is one of five auditoriums within the city. Ford Recital Hall was built in 2006 as an addition to newly renovated Powers Auditorium. Imposing and neo-classical Stambaugh Auditorium, on the city's north side, has served for decades as a site of concerts and is often rented for private events. The facility also hosts the Stambaugh Youth Concert Band. Bruce Springsteen, who sang about the decline of Youngstown's steel industry and its adverse effects on local workers in his ballad "Youngstown", played at Stambaugh Auditorium on January 12, 1996, as part of his solo Ghost of Tom Joad Tour.

The Youngstown Playhouse, Mahoning County's primary community theater, has served the area for more than 80 years, despite intermittent financial problems. Believed by some observers to be the nation's oldest continuously operating community theater, the Youngstown Playhouse was the only community theater in Ohio to ever receive major institutional support from the Ohio Arts Council. The Oakland Center for the Arts, formerly in the downtown area, was a well-known venue for locally produced plays before it closed in 2015 due to poor management. In late 2016. the Oakland Center for the Arts was re-established with a new focus on youth and kids theatre.

Well known theatrical personalities from the Youngstown area include comedic actor Joe Flynn, screen actress Elizabeth Hartman, singer and Broadway performer Maureen McGovern, and television and screen actor Ed O'Neill.

Museums

The Butler Institute of American Art is on the northeastern edge of the Youngstown State University campus. Established by industrialist Joseph G. Butler Jr., in 1919, it was the first museum in the country dedicated to American art. Across the street from the Butler Institute stands the McDonough Museum of Art, YSU's University Art Museum and the Mahoning Valley's center for contemporary art. The McDonough, established in 1991, features changing exhibitions by regional, national and international artists and provides public access to the work of students, faculty and alumni from the Department of Art. The Clarence R. Smith Mineral Museum, also on the YSU campus, is operated by the university's geology department and housed in a campus building.

To the immediate north of YSU is the Arms Family Museum of Local History. The museum, housed in a 1905 Arts & Crafts style mansion on the main artery of Wick Avenue, is managed by the Mahoning Valley Historical Society. Once the estate of a local industrialist, it maintains period rooms that showcase the household's original contents, including furnishings, art objects, and personal artifacts. The museum mounts rotating exhibits on topics related to local history. Recently, the museum opened the "Anne Kilcawley Christman Hands-on History Room". The MVHS Archival Library operates in the estate's former carriage house, near the back of the site.

The Youngstown Historical Center of Industry and Labor sits south of the YSU campus on a grade overlooking the downtown area. This museum, owned and operated by the Ohio Historical Society, focuses on the Mahoning Valley's history of steel production. Other museums include the Children's Museum of the Valley, an interactive educational center in the downtown area, and the Davis Education and Recreation Center, a small museum that showcases the history of Youngstown's Mill Creek Park.

On the city's north side the Youngstown Steel Heritage Foundation is constructing the Tod Engine Heritage Park, featuring a collection of steel industry equipment and artifacts. The main exhibit is a 1914 William Tod Co. rolling mill steam engine that was built in Youngstown and used at the Youngstown Sheet and Tube Brier Hill Works. The Tod Engine is one of three remaining rolling mill engines in the United States and is a Mechanical and Materials Engineering Landmark.

Parks and nature 

Youngstown's most popular resource is Mill Creek Park, a five-mile (8 km)-long stretch of landscaped woodland reminiscent of Rock Creek Park in Washington, D.C. Mill Creek Park is the oldest park district in Ohio, established as a township park in 1891. The park's highlights include the restored 19th century Lanterman's Mill, the rock formations of Bear's Den, scores of nature trails, the Fellows Riverside Gardens and Education Center, the "Cinderella" iron link bridge, and two 18 hole Donald Ross golf courses. Its attractions include gardens, streams, lakes, woodlands, meadows, and wildlife.

Fellows Riverside Gardens' popular lookout point offers visitors contrasting views of the area. From the south side, the canopied woodlands overlooking Lake Glacier are visible; from the north side, visitors are presented with a view of downtown Youngstown. The park features two 18-hole golf courses. The North Course is on rolling terrain, while the South Course features narrow, tree-lined fairways. Other features include playgrounds, athletic fields, and picnic areas.

In 2005, Mill Creek Park was placed on the National Register of Historic Places. A plaque commemorating this event is near a memorial statue of Volney Rogers, the Youngstown attorney who set aside land for the creation of Mill Creek Park.

A smaller recreational area called Wick Park is on the historic North side. Wick Park's periphery is lined with early 20th-century mansions built by the city's industrialists, business leaders, and professionals during Youngstown's "boom" years. Stambaugh Auditorium, a popular venue for concerts and other public events, is near the park's southwestern edge. Another small recreational area called Crandall Park is also on the North side. Crandall Park offers well-maintained and landscaped homes, tree-lined streets, and walkable access to shopping and recreations. Several cemeteries (notably historic Oak Hill Cemetery) and small recreational spaces are scattered throughout the city. Some of those recreational spaces include Homestead Park, John White park, Lynn park, Borts Pool, and the Northside Pool.

Sports
Youngstown has enjoyed a long tradition of professional and semi-professional sports. In earlier decades, the city produced scores of minor league baseball teams, including the Youngstown Ohio Works, Youngstown Champs, Youngstown Indians, Youngstown Steelmen, Youngstown Browns, Youngstown Gremlins, and Youngstown Athletics. Local enthusiasm for baseball was such that the community hosted championship games of the National Amateur Baseball Federation throughout the 1930s and 1940s. The area's minor league baseball teams were supplemented by semi-professional football teams, including the Youngstown Patricians, who won the 1915 championship of the informal "Ohio League" (a direct predecessor to the National Football League), and the Youngstown Hardhats, who competed in the Middle Atlantic Football League in the 1970s and early 1980s. For three seasons, Youngstown was home to the Mahoning Valley Thunder of the now-defunct af2, the minor league for the Arena Football League until 2009 when the franchise ceased operations. Local minor league basketball teams included the Youngstown Pride of the WBA from 1987 to 1992, the Youngstown Hawks of the IBA in 1999, and the Mahoning Valley Wildcats of the IBL in 2005. The Youngstown SteelHounds hockey team played in the Central Hockey League from 2005 until May 2008. In 2005, the Ohio Red Bulls semi-pro football team of the United States Football Association won their first championship.

Youngstown has produced many prominent athletes with connections to the city, including former world boxing champions Greg Richardson, IBF lightweight champion Harry Arroyo, College Football Hall of Fame end Bob Dove, Hall of Fame umpire Billy Evans, major league pitcher Dave Dravecky, NFL quarterback Bernie Kosar, NFL Running back Lynn Bowden Jr., IBF cruiserweight champion Jeff Lampkin, WBA lightweight champion Ray "Boom Boom" Mancini, major league manager Jimmy McAleer, WBC and WBO middleweight champion Kelly Pavlik, legendary baseball trainer "Bonesetter" Reese, major league outfielder George Shuba, and Heisman Trophy recipient Frank Sinkwich.

Youngstown State Penguins 
The community has a lengthy tradition of collegiate sports. The Youngstown State Penguins compete in the Missouri Valley Football Conference. The Penguins, noted participants in FCS (I-AA) football, play their games at Stambaugh Stadium and enjoy one of the more supportive fan bases. All other YSU athletic teams compete in the Horizon League, which does not sponsor football. The Youngstown State men and women's basketball teams hold their games at Youngstown State's Beeghly Center. The teams average about 2,500 fans per game, a number that rose with a new style of play under former Head Coach Jerry Slocum. In addition, the YSU baseball and softball teams have enjoyed local support and success. The baseball team reached the NCAA super-regionals in 2005, and the softball team did so in 2006.

Other Sports 
There are many smaller and upcoming teams in the area. Football, Soccer, Baseball and Basketball are all played at the high school level. Club sports are growing with community leagues and area leagues such as Youngstown Area Youth Soccer League. Many of the amateur and youth organizations are based in surrounding communities and not in the city itself.

Amateur soccer club Mahoning Trumbull United SC represents the area for the Northern Ohio Soccer League going into 2023.

Government and politics

Youngstown is governed by a mayor who is elected every four years and limited to a maximum of two terms. Mayors are traditionally inaugurated on or around January 2. The city has tended to elect Democratic mayors since the late 1920s because of the local unions' support for Democratic candidates for office. Youngstown's mayor is Jamael Tito Brown. Jay Williams was the city's first African-American mayor and its first independent mayor since 1922. Williams belonged to the Mayors Against Illegal Guns Coalition, a bi-partisan group with the stated goal of "making the public safer by getting illegal guns off the streets". He left his position in Youngstown to become President Barack Obama's auto czar, directing the Presidential Task Force on the Auto Industry.

Residents elect an eight-member city council composed of representatives of the city's seven wards and a council president. The council traditionally meets every first and third Wednesday of the month. Meanwhile, the board of control, chaired by the Mayor, oversees contracts for public projects within the municipal limits.

In the Ohio General Assembly, Youngstown is located in the 58th State Representative District, represented by Michele Lepore-Hagan (D), and in the 33rd Senate District, represented by Michael Rulli (R). Federally, Youngstown is located in Ohio's 13th congressional district and has been represented by Tim Ryan (D) since 2003. Its federal senators are Sherrod Brown (D) and Rob Portman (R). Like many urban areas in the U.S., Youngstown is a Democratic stronghold, although the remainder of Mahoning County has been trending to the right in recent elections. Youngstown has supported Democratic politicians in statewide elections throughout its history, including Sherrod Brown, Ted Strickland, and Richard Cordray. Youngstown has become a political backdrop for both Democrats and Republicans who go to the area to campaign on economic development and jobs.

Crime 
Crime has been a lingering problem in many of the Rust Belt's big and small urban communities, hampering economic recovery. In the late 1950s and early 1960s, Youngstown was nationally identified with gangland slayings often committed with car bombs. The town gained the nicknames "Murdertown, USA" and "Bomb City, USA," while the phrase "Youngstown tune-up" became a nationally popular slang term for car-bomb assassination. The image of Youngstown's association with crime was reinforced by the construction of prisons inside the metropolitan area. As of 2012, three adult correctional facilities continue to operate within city limits: the Mahoning County Justice Center the Northeast Ohio Correctional Center, and the Ohio State Penitentiary.

For decades, Youngstown was a haven for organized crime, and related corruption was ingrained into the fabric of its society. A 2000 publication in The New Republic listed a "chief of police, the outgoing prosecutor, the sheriff, the county engineer, members of the local police force, a city law director, several defense attorneys, politicians, judges, and a former assistant U.S. attorney" as controlled by the Mob. The city accelerated measures to limit the influence of organized crime upon all sectors of municipal life.  In 2006 Youngstown was ranked by Morgan Quitno Press, a Kansas-based publishing and research company, as the 9th most dangerous city in the United States. After The Saturday Evening Post framed Youngstown as "Crimetown U.S.A.", there was an interest by many to create documentaries or podcasts to get in-depth information about the corruption unfolding in the city. Released in July 2022, Marc Smerling released a podcast titled "Crooked City" to share some of those stories.

Education
Youngstown is served by the Public Library of Youngstown and Mahoning County system, with libraries located in the Downtown (Main), Brownlee Woods, East High, Newport, and Schenley (Michael Kusalaba) neighborhoods.

Primary and secondary

The Youngstown City School District manages all public education within the city. Since 2015, the state government has overseen the district's operation due to district mismanagement. The district's high school graduation rate has improved since the takeover, from 65% in 2015 to 88% in 2020. YCSD currently operates six elementary schools, three middle schools, and three high schools, as well as one alternative school and one technical school. The district extensively built new schools throughout the late 2000s, and sold many of its older buildings to local private schools.

At one time, the city had eight dedicated public high schools (Chaney, East, North, Rayen, South, Woodrow Wilson, Youngstown Early College, and Choffin Career and Technical Center), but since the 1990s, neighborhood schools have been merged to result in just Chaney High School on the city's West Side and East High School on the East Side, with Youngstown Rayen Early College and Choffin Career and Technical Center as district alternatives. The Early College program, in cooperation with Youngstown State University, enables middle and high school students to attend classes both on campus and at YCSD schools and earn college credit.

The Roman Catholic Diocese of Youngstown once oversaw more than 20 schools within the city. As a result of dwindling enrollment, only four Catholic schools now operate within Youngstown proper. These include two primary schools – St. Christine's School and St. Joseph the Provider School – and two secondary schools, Cardinal Mooney High School on the South Side and Ursuline High School on the North Side. Several additional Catholic schools operate in the region which accept Youngstown students.

Youngstown hosts a small number of private schools. These include Valley Christian School, a nondenominational K-12 school; Akiva Academy, a progressive K–8 school in the Jewish Community Center; and the Montessori School of the Mahoning Valley, which offers alternative learning environments for students ranging from preschool to eighth grade. There are also various smaller, K-8 charter academies in the city, such as the Stambaugh Charter Academy and South Side Academy.

Higher education

Youngstown State University, the primary institution of higher learning in the Youngstown–Warren metropolitan area, traces its origins to a local YMCA program that began offering college-level courses in 1908. YSU joined the Ohio system of higher education in 1967. The university has an enrollment of about 12,000 undergraduate and graduate students within seven colleges; the Beeghly College of Liberal Arts, Social Science & Education; College of Science, Technology, Engineering and Mathematics (STEM); Willamson College of Business; Bitonte College of Health and Human Services; Cliffe College of Creative Arts; College of Graduate Studies; and the Sokolov Honors College. The campus is just north of the city's downtown and south of Youngstown's historic Fifth Avenue district, a neighborhood of Tudor-, Victorian-, and Spanish Colonial Revival-style homes.

YSU offers tuition rates that are lower than the average of other public universities in the University System of Ohio. The university's assets include the Dana School of Music, an All-Steinway school. The Dana School of Music is one of the six oldest continuously operating schools of music in the United States. The Williamson College of Business is accredited by the Association to Advance Collegiate Schools of Business (AACSB). YSU also offers doctoral degrees in educational leadership and physical therapy as well as a doctorate in mathematics in cooperation with Rhodes University, and is a sponsor of the Northeast Ohio Medical University BS-MD program with the University of Akron, Cleveland State University, and Kent State University. YSU engineering students may also pursue doctoral studies in cooperation with the University of Akron and Cleveland State University.

Eastern Gateway Community College operates one of its two campuses in Downtown Youngstown. It offers 60 majors in the areas of business technologies, information technologies, engineering technologies, health and public services. The degrees offered are Associate of Arts, Associate of Science, Associate of Applied Business, Associate of Applied Science, Associate of Technical Studies, and Associate of Individualized Studies.

Media

Print 
The Vindicator is the sole daily newspaper in the city, currently published as a zoned edition of Warren's Tribune Chronicle in broadsheet. It formerly competed with the Warren-based paper, and the Lisbon-based Morning Journal, although they primarily covered their respective counties, with limited coverage of Mahoning County and Youngstown, until in June 2019 it was announced that The Vindicator would cease publication by mid-August of the same year. Although this newspaper carries the name of the old Vindicator, its scope is comparatively limited, with the majority of previous Vindicator journalists not being carried over to the new edition. Other newspapers that print in Youngstown include bi-monthly The Business Journal, The Metro Monthly, and the bi-weekly The Jambar, published by the students of Youngstown State University on Tuesdays and Thursdays while classes are in session.

Television 
Youngstown is served by 10 television stations, three of which are repeaters of TV stations in other cities, and a fourth coming in the near future from Pittsburgh NBC affiliate WPXI in nearby New Castle, Pennsylvania, that would easily penetrate Youngstown pending FCC approval. This is unusual for a mid-sized city near large metro areas such as Cleveland and Pittsburgh. Nearby Akron, with a larger population than Youngstown and Warren combined, has no local television stations and relies on Cleveland for its local news. The community's 273,480 television households make the Youngstown market the nation's 106th largest, according to Nielsen Media Research.

The market is served by stations affiliated with major American networks including: WFMJ-TV (channel 21, NBC), WYTV (channel 33, ABC), WYFX-LD (channel 32/62 & 27.2 on WKBN-DT2, Fox), WKBN-TV (channel 27, CBS), MY-YTV (channel 33.2, MNTV), and WBCB (channel 21.2, The CW). WFMJ-TV and its digital subchannel WBCB are both locally owned & operated by the Maag family, owners of The Vindicator. The rest of Youngstown's commercial television stations are either owned and operated by Nexstar Media Group or operated by Nexstar through a shared services agreement. Western Reserve Public Media airs on channel 45 (WNEO) from Alliance, Ohio, and channel 49 (WEAO) from Akron is a member of PBS.

Radio 
Youngstown is served by 37 different radio stations in the metropolitan area making it the 119th largest radio market in the United States. Stations include 17 on the AM band and 20 on the FM band. The majority of the most powerful and popular radio stations in the Youngstown-Warren market are divided between two national media companies: iHeartMedia and Cumulus Media.

Transportation
On June 23, 2016, Uber launched services in Youngstown, covering all of Mahoning County and most of Trumbull County.

Public transit 
The Youngstown area is served by the Western Reserve Transit Authority (WRTA) bus system, which is supported through Mahoning County property and sales taxes. WRTA, whose main terminal is in the downtown area, provides service throughout the city and into surrounding Mahoning and Trumbull counties. The downtown terminal serves as the Youngstown area's Greyhound terminal.

Regional airport 
The Youngstown-Warren Regional Airport was served by three airlines (Allegiant Air, Sun Country Airlines and Via Air, in order of market share), five rental car agencies Alamo, National, Enterprise, Budget, Avis.  Currently no airlines serve the Youngstown Regional Airport,  Allegiant Air was the last airline to service the airport ending on January 4, 2018. The nearest airport with commercial air flights as of November 2020 is Akron-Canton Airport, 59 miles to the west. Also within 70 minutes drive are the Pittsburgh International Airport and Cleveland Hopkins International Airport.

Rail 
In the vicinity of the WRTA terminal is a former Baltimore and Ohio Railroad station. The historic terminal building served B&O trains until 1971. Since converted into a banquet hall, it served Amtrak's Three Rivers (Chicago-New York) as a train station from 1995 to 2005. The nearest Amtrak service is the Capitol Limited at Alliance station 42 miles to the southwest. The local railroads in Akron now serve freight trains exclusively.

Sister cities
  Spišská Nová Ves, Slovakia, since 1991

See also
 List of people from Youngstown, Ohio
 "Youngstown" (Bruce Springsteen song)
 USS Youngstown

References

Bibliography

 Aley, Howard C. (1975). A Heritage to Share: The Bicentennial History of Youngstown and the Mahoning Valley. Youngstown, OH: The Bicentennial Commission of Youngstown and Mahoning County, Ohio.
 Blue, Frederick J.; Jenkins, William D.; Lawson, William H.; Reedy, Joan M. (1995). Mahoning Memories: A History of Youngstown and Mahoning County. Virginia Beach, VA: The Donning Company. .
 Brody, David (1960). Steelworkers in America. Cambridge, Massachusetts: Harvard University Press.
 Bruno, Robert (1999). Steelworker Alley: How Class Works in Youngstown. Ithaca, NY: Cornell University Press. .
 Fuechtmann, Thomas G. (1989). Steeples and Stacks: Religion and Steel Crisis in Youngstown. New York: Cambridge University Press. .
 Jenkins, William D. (1990). Steel Valley Klan: The Ku Klux Klan in Ohio's Mahoning Valley. Kent, OH: Kent State University Press. .
 Knepper, George W. (1989). Ohio and Its People. Kent, OH: Kent State University Press. .
 Lemann, Nicholas (1991). The Promised Land: The Great Black Migration and How It Changed America. New York: Vintage Books. .
 Linkon, Sherry Lee; Russo, John (2002). Steeltown U.S.A.: Work & Memory in Youngstown. Lawrence, KS: University Press of Kansas. .
 Warner, Jack L. (1964). My First Hundred Years in Hollywood. New York: Random House.

External links

 

 
Cities in Ohio
Cities in Mahoning County, Ohio
Cities in Trumbull County, Ohio
1796 establishments in the Northwest Territory
County seats in Ohio
Populated places established in 1796
Western Reserve, Ohio